Lawrence Edward Schofield (2 December 1908 – 14 June 1969) was an Australian politician.

He was born at Tamworth to grocer William Edward Schofield and Madeline Bizant. He attended the local Dominican convent until 1939, when he became a mill operator at Mayfield. On 6 June 1931 he married Ilma Scott, with whom he had two children. In 1948 he joined the Labor Party, serving on the central executive from 1957 to 1958 and from 1961 to 1967; he was also the Newcastle secretary of the Federated Ironworkers' Association from 1949 to 1967. From 1967 to 1969 he was a Labor member of the New South Wales Legislative Council. Schofield died at Merewether in 1969.

References

1908 births
1969 deaths
Australian Labor Party members of the Parliament of New South Wales
Members of the New South Wales Legislative Council
20th-century Australian politicians